Madam Oh is 1965 South Korean drama film directed by Bong-rae Lee.

Plot
During Japan's occupation of Korea, a Korean man and his Japanese lover conceived a child. While his lover was pregnant, the Japanese ended their occupation and the couple was forced to separate. After twenty years, the man is finally given an opportunity to meet his daughter. He learns that she is working at a coffee shop but has difficulties with money. Against the wishes of his current wife, he attempts to help his daughter with her problems.

External links

1965 films
1960s Korean-language films
South Korean romantic drama films
1965 romantic drama films